"Sooner or Later" is a song by American rock band Breaking Benjamin. It was released in September 2004 as the second single from their second album, We Are Not Alone.

Background
The song received a fair amount of radio play, as it reached No. 2 on the Mainstream Rock chart, No. 7 on the Alternative Songs chart and No. 99 on the Hot 100. The song was performed live on The Tonight Show with Jay Leno, April 8, 2005.

As of February 11, 2010, "Sooner or Later" has been released as a downloadable content on Guitar Hero 5 as part of the Breaking Benjamin Track Pack DLC, along with two other singles: "Until the End" and "Give Me a Sign".

Track listing

Music video
A music video was made for "Sooner or Later". The music video featured the band playing in a small enclosed area surrounded by screens, showing clips of a woman going from place to place throughout the city of Toronto in Canada Ontario. As she enters the room, the band is gone showing on the screens as they walk away.

Critical reception
Bram Teitelman of Billboard reviewed the song favorably, stating that while the song isn't instantly catchy, it is "nonetheless a commercial blast of hard rock that will continue to bolster the band's high profile."

Charts

References

2004 singles
Breaking Benjamin songs
Hollywood Records singles
2004 songs
Song recordings produced by David Bendeth
Songs written by Benjamin Burnley